The Color Purple is a 1982 epistolary novel by American author Alice Walker which won the 1983 Pulitzer Prize for Fiction and the National Book Award for Fiction. It was later adapted into a film and musical of the same name.

The novel has been the frequent target of censors and appears on the American Library Association list of the 100 Most Frequently Challenged Books of 2000–2010 at number seventeen  because of the sometimes explicit content, particularly in terms of violence. In 2003, the book was listed on the BBC's The Big Read poll of the UK's "best-loved novels."

Plot 

Celie is a poor 14-year-old African-American girl living in rural Georgia in the early 1900s. She writes letters to God because her father Alphonso beats and rapes her, resulting in two children, Olivia and Adam, that he abducts. A farmer identified as "Mister" asks to marry her younger sister Nettie, and Alphonso gives him Celie instead. Mister abuses Celie physically, sexually and verbally, and his two prior children mistreat her as well. Soon afterward Nettie runs away and stays with Celie, but Mister makes advances toward her. Celie tells her to seek help from a well-dressed black woman she saw in town. Nettie promises to write but never does, and Celie concludes that she is dead.

Mister's son Harpo falls in love with an assertive girl named Sofia, gets her pregnant and marries her. Soon they have six children. Celie is impressed by Sofia's self-esteem and asks Harpo to treat her well, but Mister chides him for what he considers weakness. In a moment of envy, Celie tells Harpo to beat Sofia. Sofia fights back and confronts Celie, who apologizes and confides about Mister's abuse.

Mister takes in Shug Avery, a jazz and blues singer and Mister's long-time mistress, during an illness. Celie, who has been fascinated by photos of Shug that she found in Mister's belongings, is thrilled to have her there. Mister's father expresses disapproval of the arrangement, reminding Mister that Shug has three out-of-wedlock children, though Mister implies to him that he is those children's father, upon which Mister's father leaves in disgust. While Shug is initially rude to Celie, who has taken charge of nursing her, the two become friends, and Celie soon finds herself infatuated with Shug.

Frustrated by Harpo's domineering behavior, Sofia moves out, taking her children with her. Several months later, Harpo opens a juke joint where a fully recovered Shug performs nightly. Shug decides to stay when she learns that Mister beats Celie when she is away. Shug and Celie grow closer.

Sofia returns for a visit and promptly gets into a fight with Harpo's new girlfriend, Squeak, knocking Squeak's teeth out. She begins seeing a prizefighter, and while they are in town one day she has verbal spat with the mayor's wife, Miss Millie. The mayor and Sofia exchange blows, whereupon the police beat Sofia severely, leaving her disfigured and debilitated. She is subsequently sentenced to 12 years in prison. Squeak tries to blackmail her uncle, the sheriff, into releasing Sofia, but he refuses and rapes Squeak. Squeak cares for Sofia's children while she is incarcerated, and the two women develop a friendship. Sofia is eventually released and begins working for Miss Millie, which she detests.

Despite being newly married to a man called Grady, Shug instigates a sexual relationship with Celie on her next visit. One night Shug asks Celie about her sister, and Shug helps Celie recover letters from Nettie that Mister has been hiding from her for decades. The letters indicate that Nettie befriended a missionary couple, Samuel and Corrine, the well-dressed woman Celie saw in the store. Nettie eventually accompanied them to Africa to do missionary work, Samuel and Corrine having unwittingly adopted both Adam and Olivia. Corrine, noticing her adopted children resemble Nettie, wonders if Samuel fathered the children with Nettie. Increasingly suspicious, Corrine tries to limit Nettie's role in her family.

Through her letters, Nettie reveals she has become disillusioned with her missionary work. Corrine became ill with a fever, and Nettie asked Samuel to tell her how he adopted Olivia and Adam. Realizing Adam and Olivia are Celie's children, Nettie then learned Alphonso is actually her and Celie's stepfather. Their actual father was a store owner that white men lynched because they resented his success. She also learned their mother suffered a mental collapse after her husband's death and that Alphonso exploited the situation to control their mother's considerable wealth.

Nettie confesses to Samuel and Corrine she is the children's biological aunt. The gravely ill Corrine refuses to believe her until Nettie reminds her of her previous encounter with Celie in the store. Later, Corrine dies, finally having accepted Nettie's story. Meanwhile, Celie visits Alphonso, who confirms Nettie's story. Celie begins to lose some of her faith in God, which she confides to Shug, who explains to Celie her own unique religious philosophy. Shug helps Celie realize that God is not someone who has power over her like the rest of the men in Celie's life. Rather, God is an “it” and not a “who."

Having had enough of her husband's abuse, Celie decides to leave Mister along with Shug and Squeak, who is considering a singing career of her own. Celie puts a curse on Mister before leaving him for good, settling in Tennessee and supporting herself as a seamstress.  

Alphonso dies, Celie inherits his land, and moves back into her childhood home. Around this time, Shug falls in love with Germaine, a member of her band, and this news crushes Celie. Shug travels with Germaine, all the while writing postcards to Celie. Celie pledges to love Shug even if Shug does not love her back.

Celie learns that Mister, suffering from a considerable decline in fortunes after Celie left him, has changed dramatically, and Celie begins to call him by his first name, Albert. Albert proposes that they marry "in the spirit as well as in the flesh," but Celie declines.

Meanwhile, Nettie and Samuel marry and prepare to return to America. Before they leave, Adam marries Tashi, an African girl. Following an African tradition, Tashi undergoes the painful rituals of female circumcision and facial scarring. In solidarity, Adam undergoes the same facial scarring ritual.

As Celie realizes that she is content in her life without Shug, Shug returns, having ended her relationship with Germaine. Nettie, Samuel, Olivia, Adam, and Tashi all arrive at Celie's house. Nettie and Celie reunite after 30 years and introduce one another to their respective families.

Critical reception 
The Color Purple won the Pulitzer Prize for Fiction in 1983, making Walker the first black woman to win the prize.  Walker also won the National Book Award for Fiction in 1983. Mel Watkins of the New York Times Book Review wrote that it is a "striking and consummately well-written novel", praising its powerful emotional impact and epistolary structure. It was also named a PBS Great American Read Top 100 Pick.

Though the novel has garnered critical acclaim, it has also been the subject of controversy. The American Library Association placed it on the list of top hundred banned and challenged books in the United States from 1990 to 1999 (17), 2000 to 2009 (17), and 2010 to 2019 (50), as well as the top ten list for 2007 (6) and 2009 (9). Commonly cited justifications for banning the book include sexual explicitness, explicit language, violence, and homosexuality.

The book received greater scrutiny amidst controversy surrounding the release of the film adaptation in 1985. The controversy centered around the depiction of black men, which some critics saw as feeding stereotypical narratives of black male violence, while others found the representation compelling and relatable.

On November 5, 2019, the BBC News listed The Color Purple on its list of the 100 most influential novels.

Adaptations

The novel was adapted into a film of the same name in 1985. It was directed by Steven Spielberg and stars Whoopi Goldberg as Celie, Danny Glover as Albert, and Oprah Winfrey as Sofia. Though nominated for eleven Academy Awards, it won none. This perceived snubbing ignited controversy because many critics considered it the best picture that year, including Roger Ebert.

On December 1, 2005, a musical adaptation of the novel and film with lyrics and music by Stephen Bray, Brenda Russell and Allee Willis, and book by Marsha Norman opened at The Broadway Theatre in New York City. The show was produced by Scott Sanders, Quincy Jones, Harvey Weinstein, and Oprah Winfrey, who was also an investor.

In 2008, BBC Radio 4 broadcast a radio adaptation of the novel in ten 15-minute episodes as a Woman's Hour serial with Nadine Marshall as Celie, Nikki Amuka-Bird, Nina Sosanya and Eamonn Walker. The script was by Patricia Cumper and in 2009 the production received the Sony Radio Academy Awards Silver Drama Award.

Boycotting Israel
As part of the Boycott, Divestment and Sanctions movement (BDS), the author declined publication of the book in Israel in 2012. This decision was criticized by Harvard Law Professor Alan Dershowitz, who argued that Walker "resorted to bigotry and censorship against Hebrew-speaking readers of her writings". Walker, an ardent pro-Palestinian activist, said in a letter to Yediot Books that Israel practices apartheid and must change its policies before her works can be published there.

Editions

See also

 Feminist literature
 Black feminism
 African-American literature

References

Notes

Citations

Further reading
Singh, Sonal, and Sushma Gupta. “Celie’s Emancipation in the Novel The Color Purple.” International Transactions in Humanities and Social Sciences, vol. 2, no. 2, Dec. 2010, pp. 218–221.Humanities International Complete.
Tahir, Ary S. “Gender Violence in Toni Morrison’s The Bluest Eye and Alice Walker’s The Color Purple.” Journal of Language and Literature Education, no. 11, 2014, pp. 1–19. Literature Resource Center, doi:10.12973/jlle.11.243.

External links
Alice Walker discusses The Color Purple on the BBC's World Book Club
New Georgia Encyclopedia
Photos of the first edition of The Color Purple
"Alice Walker on 30th Anniv. of The Color Purple: Racism, Violence Against Women Are Global Issues", from Democracy Now! September 28, 2012.

1982 American novels
Epistolary novels
Feminist novels
Womanist novels
National Book Award for Fiction winning works
American novels adapted into films
Novels about rape
Novels by Alice Walker
Pulitzer Prize for Fiction-winning works
Novels about racism
American LGBT novels
1980s LGBT novels
Novels set in the 1930s
Novels set in Georgia (U.S. state)
Harcourt (publisher) books
Censored books
Novels with bisexual themes
Female bisexuality in fiction
African-American novels
African-Americans in literature